"Tiimmy Turner" is a song by American rapper Desiigner. It was released on July 22, 2016, for digital download by GOOD Music and Def Jam Recordings. The song was written and produced by Desiigner alongside Mike Dean. The official remix of the song, which features vocals and production from Kanye West as well as additional production from Nana Kwabena Tuffuor and Noah Goldstein, was also commercially released on October 14, 2016. The song was certified platinum by the Recording Industry Association of America (RIAA) in December 2016, for earning a million equivalent units in the United States.

"Tiimmy Turner" received critical acclaim, and was ranked at number 44 on Rolling Stones "50 Best Songs of 2016" list.

Background
Desiigner initially previewed "Tiimmy Turner" during his freestyle for XXLs "Freshmen Class of 2016". Shortly after, Desiigner shared a video of himself alongside longtime Kanye West-collaborator Mike Dean, working on the official version of the song. Then on July 21, 2016, Desiigner released the song on YouTube then for digital download on the iTunes Store the next day.

Commercial performance
"Tiimmy Turner" debuted at number 46 on the US Billboard Hot 100 for the chart issue dated August 13, 2016. "Tiimmy Turner" peaked at number 34 on the Hot 100, and number 38 on the Canadian Hot 100, becoming Desiigner's second top 40 entry in both countries.

Song meaning
Timmy Turner is a character on the 2000s Nickelodeon cartoon series The Fairly OddParents, whose fairy godparents grant him wishes. In the context of this song, Timmy is a metaphor for Desiigner, the clue being the spelling of "Tiimmy" in the title. Desiigner explained in a video interview with All Def Digital:

Charts

Weekly charts

Year-end charts

Certifications

References

External links

Lyrics of this song at Genius

2016 singles
2016 songs
Def Jam Recordings singles
GOOD Music singles
Songs written by Mike Dean (record producer)
Desiigner songs
Song recordings produced by Mike Dean (record producer)